Gare de Pont-Audemer is a former railway station in the market town of Pont-Audemer, Eure in Upper Normandy. The station is on the railway line from Paris-Saint-Lazare to Honfleur via Brionne.

The CF de l'Ouest company built the line from Glos-Montfort and opened it on 23 August 1867, with an extension to Honfleur opened 8 August 1889. The line closed in 1977 but the station remained open as a ticket office as well as a headquarters for PontAuRail from 1995 to the end of the association in September 2006.

References

Railway stations in France opened in 1867
Railway stations closed in 1977
Defunct railway stations in Normandy
Buildings and structures in Eure